Aziz Lahbabi (born 3 February 1991, in Khenifra) is a Moroccan long-distance runner. At the 2012 Summer Olympics, he competed in the Men's 5000 metres, finishing 31st overall in Round 1, failing to qualify for the final.

He won his first international medal at the 2010 World Junior Championships in Athletics, taking third place in the 5000 metres. He placed 13th at the senior race for the 2011 African Cross Country Championships, which was enough for a team bronze medal. He set a 5000 m best of 13:13.68 minutes that June, but was caught doping shortly afterwards, receiving a six-month ban for methylhexanamine.

Lahbabi was a double medallist at the 2013 Mediterranean Games, taking 5000 m bronze and a 10,000 metres silver medal. He won his national championship in the 5000 m and was selected for the 2013 World Championships in Athletics, where he ran in the heats only. He won the Roma-Ostia Half Marathon in 2014 with a significant personal best of 59:25 minutes – a Moroccan record and the fastest by a non-East African runner.

References

External links

1991 births
Living people
Moroccan male long-distance runners
Olympic athletes of Morocco
Athletes (track and field) at the 2012 Summer Olympics
People from Khenifra
Doping cases in athletics
Moroccan sportspeople in doping cases
Mediterranean Games silver medalists for Morocco
Athletes (track and field) at the 2013 Mediterranean Games
Mediterranean Games medalists in athletics
21st-century Moroccan people